Steven Bishop (born 3 March 1970) is an Australian drummer, formerly of Australian band Powderfinger though he left the band before their rise to prominence because of illness.  Later, while working in the UK for two years he played in London-based bands. He has since gone on to record and perform with other Brisbane-based bands, including Moonjuice, The Haymakers, Dagwood and The Predators (for which he is also lead vocalist).Later in life Steven had a career in film and television after finishing at Griffith Film School in 2006. He now works in the IT Industry."On the prowl with The Predators" , Fasterlouder.com.au, retrieved 8 June 2007</ref>

References

1970 births
Australian rock drummers
Male drummers
Living people
Musicians from Brisbane
Powderfinger members
21st-century drummers